Pavel Morshchinin (22 January 1933 – 30 May 2009) was a Russian cross-country skier. He competed in the men's 15 kilometre event at the 1960 Winter Olympics.

References

External links
 

1933 births
2009 deaths
Russian male cross-country skiers
Olympic cross-country skiers of the Soviet Union
Cross-country skiers at the 1960 Winter Olympics
People from Krasnoye Selo